The Tonopah Main Post Office, also known as US Post Office–Tonopah Main, is the main post office in Tonopah, Nevada. Built in 1941, the post office was the first and only federally constructed post office in the city. The post office was designed in a Starved Classical style typical of federal buildings of the era. The government began planning the post office in 1937, and its site was chosen in 1940. The building's cornerstone was laid in May 1941; a civic ceremony and parade marked the occasion. The post office opened for business on December 7, 1941, the same day as the attack on Pearl Harbor. In addition to serving as Tonopah's post office, the building also houses government offices in its basement.

The post office was added to the National Register of Historic Places on February 28, 1990.

References

External links

Main Post Office
Buildings and structures in Nye County, Nevada
Government buildings completed in 1941
Post office buildings on the National Register of Historic Places in Nevada
National Register of Historic Places in Tonopah, Nevada
Streamline Moderne architecture in the United States
1941 establishments in Nevada